Skawinki  is a village in the administrative district of Gmina Lanckorona, within Wadowice County, Lesser Poland Voivodeship, in southern Poland.

The village has a population of 1,600.

References

Skawinki